Cobbham is an unincorporated community along the  McDuffie County, and Columbia County line in the U.S. state of Georgia.

History
The community was named after local landholder and Revolutionary War veteran Thomas Cobb.

References

Unincorporated communities in McDuffie County, Georgia
Unincorporated communities in Georgia (U.S. state)